The Crystal Wing Awards are annual awards that recognise personal accomplishments in the areas of social, cultural, economic and public life. The 20th edition of the awards, conceived by Mária Vaškovičová, was held in January 2017.

Categories and awards

Philanthropy
 2015 – Miroslava Hunčíková
 2016 – Ondrej Vrábel
 2017 – Marek Machata

Sport
 2015 – Matej Tóth
 2016 – Ladislav Škantár and Peter Škantár
 2017 –

Journalism and Literature
 2015 – 
 2016 – 
 2017 – Dagmar Mozolová

Economy
 2015 – Jozef Barcaj
 2016 – Štefan Máj
 2017 – Vladimír Bakeš

Music
 2015 – 
 2016 – Dalibor Karvay
 2017 – Rastislav Štúr

Rock Pop Jazz
 2015 – Szidi Tobias
 2016 – Igor Timko
 2017 – Celeste Buckingham

Medicine and Science
 2015 – Igor Lacík
 2016 – Michal Mego
 2017 – Lukáš Plank

Visual Arts
 2015 – Ivan Pavle
 2016 – Palo Macho
 2017 – Juraj Čutek

Acting
 2015 – 
 2016 – Zuzana Mauréry
 2017 –

References

Slovak awards
Awards established in 1997
1997 establishments in Slovakia